The Puerto Rico national under-15 football team represents Puerto Rico in the CONCACAF Boys Under-15 Championship.

History

2013
Puerto Rico made its first appearance in the first CONCACAF Under-15 Championship in 2013. The team was managed by Jeaustin Campos. They couldn't advance from the first round after 3 wins and 2 defeats.

2017
The team returned to the field in 2017 with Carlos Cantarero as head coach. They played two friendlies against United States Virgin Islands before heading to the CONCACAF Championship played in Bradenton, Florida.

They couldn't advance the first round after losing their crucial match against Barbados. The team finished the tournament with a win against Guyana.

Results and fixtures
The following is a list of match results in the last 12 months, as well as any future matches that have been scheduled.

Legend

2021

Current squad
The following players were selected for the CFU 2020 Boys' U-14 Challenge Series

Head coaches
 2013 –  Jeaustin Campos
 2017 –  Carlos García Cantarero
 2021 –  Pablo Almagro

References

National
F
Youth sport in Puerto Rico